Umar Hajee Ahmed Jhaveri was a Memon Indian South African businessman. It was a court case concerning him that brought Mahatma Gandhi to South Africa. Hajee Ahmed assisted Gandhi in setting up the South African Indian Congress.

South African Muslims
South African people of Indian descent
Mahatma Gandhi
Year of birth missing
Year of death missing